Rob Adams may refer to:

Rob Adams (actor) (born 1970), American actor, film acting coach and former college football quarterback
Rob Adams (architect) (born 1948), Australian architect and urban designer

See also
Robert Adams (disambiguation)